Daniel Alberto Néculman Suárez (born May 25, 1985) is an Argentine-Chilean former footballer who played for clubs in Argentina, Ecuador, Colombia, Peru, Chile, Mexico and Bolivia.

Career
Born in Bariloche, Néculman began playing club football for local side Club Deportivo Municipales. After he impressed in the Bariloche local league with Municipales, Néculman signed for another Patagonian club Comisión de Actividades Infantiles Comodoro Rivadavia in the summer of 2002. He made his senior debut for C.A.I. in the 2002–03 Primera B Nacional relegation playoffs against Racing de Córdoba. Néculman failed to secure a regular place in C.A.I.'s first team, so he went on loan to Argentino A side Huracán de Comodoro Rivadavia. By 2006, Néculman moved to another Patagonian club Deportivo Madryn, playing in the Argentino B.

Néculman had his first opportunity to play abroad when he signed with Ecuador's Imbabura S.C. in 2007. It was the club's first ever season in the Ecuadorian Serie A, and Néculman led the club by scoring 16 goals (the second most in the league) but the club were relegated at the end of the season.

Néculman joined Colombia's Categoría Primera A side Independiente Santa Fe at the beginning of 2008. Initially, he failed to settle, but when manager "Pecoso" Castro was dismissed midway through the season, Néculman flourished under new manager Hernán Darío Gómez.

After a few seasons in Colombia, Néculman returned to Ecuador where he played for C.D. Olmedo and L.D.U. Portoviejo before joining Serie A side River Plate Ecuador in 2015. He was the top goalscorer for River, notching 10 goals by May 2015.

Late in his career, Néculman returned to Argentina where he played for Ferro Carril Oeste (General Pico) in the 2019–20 Torneo Federal A.

In total, Néculman played for 19 professional football clubs over nearly two decades; most of them outside his native Argentina.

Titles
 Independiente Santa Fé 2009 (Copa Colombia)

Personal life
Neculmán holds Chilean nationality by descent, since his mother is Chilean. He also naturalized Ecuadorian by residence.

References

External links
 
 

1985 births
Living people
Sportspeople from Bariloche
Argentine sportspeople of Chilean descent
Argentine footballers
Argentine expatriate footballers
Citizens of Chile through descent
Chilean footballers
Chilean expatriate footballers
Primera Nacional players
Torneo Argentino A players
Torneo Argentino B players
Comisión de Actividades Infantiles footballers
Huracán de Comodoro Rivadavia footballers
Deportivo Madryn players
Ecuadorian Serie A players
Imbabura S.C. footballers
Guayaquil City F.C. footballers
C.D. Cuenca footballers
Categoría Primera A players
Independiente Santa Fe footballers
Deportivo Pereira footballers
Peruvian Primera División players
Sporting Cristal footballers
Primera B de Chile players
Unión Temuco footballers
Naval de Talcahuano footballers
Ecuadorian Serie B players
C.D. Olmedo footballers
L.D.U. Portoviejo footballers
Ascenso MX players
C.F. Mérida footballers
Bolivian Primera División players
Club Blooming players
Argentine expatriate sportspeople in Ecuador
Argentine expatriate sportspeople in Colombia
Argentine expatriate sportspeople in Peru
Argentine expatriate sportspeople in Chile
Argentine expatriate sportspeople in Mexico
Argentine expatriate sportspeople in Bolivia
Chilean expatriate sportspeople in Ecuador
Chilean expatriate sportspeople in Colombia
Chilean expatriate sportspeople in Peru
Chilean expatriate sportspeople in Mexico
Chilean expatriate sportspeople in Bolivia
Expatriate footballers in Ecuador
Expatriate footballers in Colombia
Expatriate footballers in Peru
Expatriate footballers in Chile
Expatriate footballers in Mexico
Expatriate footballers in Bolivia
Association football forwards
Argentine football managers
Chilean football managers
Argentine expatriate football managers
Chilean expatriate football managers
Expatriate football managers in Ecuador
Naturalized citizens of Chile
Naturalized citizens of Ecuador
Chilean people of Mapuche descent
Mapuche sportspeople
Indigenous sportspeople of the Americas